is a Japanese football player. He plays for Renofa Yamaguchi FC.

Career
Hiroto Ishikawa joined J1 League club Sagan Tosu in 2016.

Club statistics
Updated to 24 February 2019.

References

External links
Profile at Sagan Tosu

1998 births
Living people
Association football people from Fukuoka Prefecture
Japanese footballers
J1 League players
J3 League players
Sagan Tosu players
Roasso Kumamoto players
Renofa Yamaguchi FC players
Association football defenders